101² is the second studio album by American country music band Highway 101. It accounted for four singles on the Hot Country Songs: "(Do You Love Me) Just Say Yes" at  1, "All the Reasons Why" at No. 5, "Honky Tonk Heart" at No. 6, and their cover of Dire Straits' "Setting Me Up" at No. 7. The album itself reached No. 8 on Top Country Albums.

Track listing

Charts

Weekly charts

Year-end charts

References

Warner Records albums
1988 albums
Highway 101 albums
Albums produced by Paul Worley